Kay Johnson (born 18 July 1940) is a retired sprinter from Western Australia. During the 1958 British Empire and Commonwealth Games in Cardiff, she won a silver medal in the 4 × 110 yards relay, and also competed in the 100 yards event.

References

1940 births
Living people
20th-century Australian women
21st-century Australian women
21st-century Australian people
Athletes (track and field) at the 1958 British Empire and Commonwealth Games
Australian female sprinters
Commonwealth Games silver medallists for Australia
Sportswomen from Western Australia
Commonwealth Games medallists in athletics
Medallists at the 1958 British Empire and Commonwealth Games